
Lago di Robièi is a lake in Ticino, Switzerland. It is located at an elevation of  near Lago dei Cavagnöö and Lago del Zött.

The reservoir can be reached by following the road through the Maggia Valley to Bignasco and proceeding to San Carlo.

The dam was completed in 1967.

See also
List of mountain lakes of Switzerland

Lakes of Ticino
Reservoirs in Switzerland